Shabiluy-e Olya (also Romanized as Shabīlūy-e ‘Olyā; also known as Shabīlū-ye Bālā and Shabīlū-ye ‘Olyā) is a village in Zarrineh Rud-e Shomali Rural District, in the Central District of Miandoab County, West Azerbaijan Province, Iran. At the 2006 census, its population was 1,160, in 293 families.

References 

Populated places in Miandoab County